Kastriot Luan Dermaku (born 15 January 1992) is an Albanian professional footballer who plays as a defender for  club Lecce. Born in Italy, he represents the Albania national team.

Early life
Dermaku was born in Scandiano, in the northeast part of Italy is the son of Luan Dermaku, former professional footballer who played as a forward for Prishtina during Fadil Vokrri's era.

Club career

Melfi
Dermaku emerged to the senior team in the beginning of the 2011–12 season, where he made his professional debut on 30 October 2011 in the matchday 13 against Celano, playing the last 13 minutes of a 4–0 home triumph. Later on 4 December, Dermaku made his second appearance of the season as well as his first start in a 3–1 away defeat to Paganese. He finished his first senior season by making eight league appearances, as Federiciani finished the season in 16th position in Lega Pro 2.

In his last season the 2014–15, Dermaku was named as a team captain. On 1 April 2015, Dermaku made his 100th league appearance for the club by scoring in Melfi's 2–3 away win over Casertana.

Empoli
On 15 May 2015, Dermaku completed a transfer to Empoli by penning a three-year contract with the Serie A club. He was seen as a replacement for Daniele Rugani which left for Juventus.

Cosenza
On 31 August 2017, after he become a free agent following the departure from Empoli, Dermaku joined Cosenza on a two-year contract. He made his debut for the club on 9 September in the goalless draw against Matera, while his first goal came on 31 March of the following year in the 2–1 win at Juve Stabia. Dermaku concluded his first season by making 40 appearances in Serie C, all of them as starter, collecting 3555 minutes; Rossoblù achieved their promotion to Serie B for the first time in 15 years.

Even after the club returned in Serie B, Dermaku was able to retain his place in the starting lineup, making 33 appearances in the 2018–19 season. His debut in the league came in the opening matchday against Ascoli which ended in a 1–1 draw at Stadio Cino e Lillo Del Duca. On 22 April 2019, he scored his first Serie B goal, the winner against Spezia at home.

Following the end of the season, Dermaku become free agent after his contract expired and he decided not to renew it. He concluded his spell with Cosenza by 79 matches between league and cup, scoring twice in the process.

Parma
On 7 July 2019, Dermaku signed a four-year contract with top flight side Parma.

Lecce
On 5 October 2020, he was loaned to Lecce for the 2020–21 season. On 30 August 2021, he moved to Lecce on a permanent basis and signed a three-year contract.

International career

Albania

Under-21
On 30 January 2013, Dermaku received a call-up from Albania U21 for the friendly match against Macedonia U21 and made his debut after coming on as a substitute at 66th minute in place of Gentian Durak.

Kosovo
On 31 August 2018, Dermaku received a call-up from Kosovo for the 2018–19 UEFA Nations League matches against Azerbaijan and Faroe Islands, he was an unused bench in the first match. On 9 September 2018, Dermaku left from the gathering with Kosovo after he was not named in the starting line-up in the match against Faroe Islands and he opted to represent Albania instead.

Return to Albania
On 2 October 2018, Dermaku received a call-up from Albania for the friendly match against Jordan and 2018–19 UEFA Nations League match against Israel. One week later he received the Albanian citizenship to be eligible to play for the national side. In the next day, he made his debut for Albania in the first match against Jordan after coming on as a substitute at 56th minute in place of Mërgim Mavraj.

Career statistics

Club

International

Scores and results list Albania's goal tally first, score column indicates score after each Dermaku goal.

References

External links

1992 births
Living people
People from Scandiano
Albanian footballers
Albania international footballers
Albania under-21 international footballers
Italian footballers
Kosovo Albanians
Italian people of Albanian descent
Italian people of Kosovan descent
Association football defenders
Serie C players
A.S. Melfi players
F.C. Pavia players
S.S.D. Lucchese 1905 players
Serie A players
Empoli F.C. players
Serie B players
Cosenza Calcio players
Parma Calcio 1913 players
U.S. Lecce players
Footballers from Emilia-Romagna
Sportspeople from the Province of Reggio Emilia